Baron  was a Japanese general in the Imperial Japanese Army and diplomat. He served as the Japanese ambassador to Germany before and during World War II and was, unwittingly, a major source of communications intelligence for the Allies. His role was perhaps best summed up by General George C. Marshall, who identified Ōshima as "our main basis of information regarding Hitler's intentions in Europe". After World War II, he was convicted of war crimes and sentenced to life imprisonment, but was paroled in 1955.

Biography

Early life
Ōshima came from a provincial low-ranking samurai family from Gifu Prefecture. His father  was a known Germanophile, a trait the future ambassador to Berlin would inherit, who nevertheless rose up the ranks and eventually served as Army Minister from 1916 to 1918, ironically waging war against Imperial Germany.

Much was thus expected of the young Ōshima and his rise in the Imperial Army structure was swift. He graduated from the Imperial Japanese Army Academy in June 1905, the 18th of his class, and was promoted to second lieutenant in June 1906, then to lieutenant in June 1908. He graduated from the 27th class of the Army War College in May 1915, and was promoted to captain the following year.

From 1918 to 1919, he served in Siberia with the expeditionary forces, and was appointed assistant military attaché in the Japanese embassy to the Weimar Republic. Promoted to major in January 1922, he served as a military attaché to Budapest and Vienna from 1923 to 1924. After his return to Japan, he was promoted to lieutenant colonel in August 1926. Following a promotion to colonel in August 1930, he served as commander of the 10th Field Artillery Regiment from 1930 to 1931.

Military and diplomatic career
In 1934, Colonel Ōshima became Japanese military attaché in Berlin. He spoke almost perfect German, and was soon befriended by Joachim von Ribbentrop, then Adolf Hitler's favourite foreign policy advisor. Although Hitler ostensibly used the Foreign Ministry (Auswärtiges Amt) for his foreign relations, he was actually more dependent on the Dienststelle Ribbentrop, a competing foreign office operated by the ex-champagne salesman.

Ōshima was promoted to major general in March 1935. Under Ribbentrop's guidance, Ōshima met privately with Hitler that fall. With the support of the Nazi leadership and the Imperial Japanese Army General Staff, Ōshima progressed rapidly while in Berlin. He attained the rank of lieutenant general and was appointed ambassador to Germany in October 1938. He then transferred to the army reserve. During his early months as ambassador, according to evidence presented later at the Nürnberg Trial of Major War Criminals, he plotted the assassination of Joseph Stalin by Russian agents sympathetic to his cause. In a conversation that Ōshima had with Heinrich Himmler on 31 January 1939, the former expressed the hope that German-Japanese co-operation in the field of intelligence would lead eventually to the disintegration of the Soviet Union. Ōshima was instrumental in the forging and signing of the Anti-Comintern Pact on 25 November 1936 and the Tripartite Pact on 27 September 1940.

However, on August 25, 1939, the German government decided to conclude the Molotov–Ribbentrop Pact and to suspend negotiations on a Japan-German alliance and defense agreement. This caused great turmoil in the Japanese government, contributing to the collapse of the Hiranuma Cabinet. Ōshima  was recalled to Japan (with Saburō Kurusu succeeding him) to take responsibility in September 1939, and was dismissed as an ambassador on December 27.

Ōshima's importance for Hitler can be seen in the fact that after the conclusion of the Anti-Comintern Pact, the US Ambassador in Japan, Joseph Grew, estimated that the agreement was mainly the result of Ōshima's work, without the participation of the Japanese Ministry of Foreign Affairs. At the insistence of the Nazi government, he returned to Berlin as ambassador in February 1941, and remained in that position until the German surrender in May 1945. He dedicated his efforts to closer relations between the two countries. This including military cooperation in the Indian Ocean area (in the form of anti-merchant submarine warfare). Such was his fanatical belief in Nazi ideology that American journalist William L. Shirer, in The Rise and Fall of the Third Reich, wrote that Ōshima was "more Nazi than the Nazis."

Ōshima's close relationship with Hitler and Ribbentrop gave him unparalleled access, for a foreigner, to German war plans and national policy; comparable to that of Winston Churchill with the American war leadership. In turn, Hitler admired the militaristic Japanese and made Ōshima a personal confidante.

Ōshima made visits to the Eastern Front and the Atlantic Wall, and he met periodically with Hitler and other Nazi leaders. Being a meticulous military officer in training, he wrote detailed reports of the information provided to him by the Nazis. The reports were sent by radio to Tokyo in the Purple diplomatic cipher. Unknown to the Japanese, the Purple cipher was broken by American codebreakers in 1940. Thus, Oshima's reports were read almost simultaneously by his superiors in Japan and by Allied leaders and analysts as "Magic" intelligence. Sometimes, the Allies read the reports before the Japanese did, as transmission problems between Germany and Japan often held up the reports for hours. Ōshima was interviewed in 1959 and asked about the security of his transmissions. He said that he had been warned in 1941 by Heinrich Georg Stahmer that there were signs that Japanese diplomatic messages were being read by the Allies, but that he was convinced that, by double-encrypting his dispatches, he had ensured they could not be decrypted by the Allies. He died before the Allied decryption of Purple messages became common knowledge and so never knew that he had unwittingly provided the Allies with priceless intelligence.

Pacific War
On 13 February 1941, Ōshima discussed the possibility of a joint German-Japanese initiative for war against the British Empire and the United States with Ribbentrop, agreeing with him the time was ripe to strike at the British Empire in Asia. On 23 February 1941, Ribbentrop urged him to press the Japanese government to attack British possessions in East Asia. On 28 November 1941, in a conversation with German Foreign Minister, Ōshima was given an assurance that Nazi Germany would join the Japanese government in case of war against the United States.

Such was Hitler's high esteem that Ōshima was one of only 15 recipients of the Grand Cross of the Order of the German Eagle in Gold. Hitler awarded the medal following the attack on Pearl Harbor in 1941. The award ceremony was attended by Reich Foreign Minister Ribbentrop and the secret notes of the conference were revealed at the Nuremberg trials in 1945. In addressing Ōshima, Hitler reportedly said:

Germany presses for Japanese attack on Soviets

Despite Ōshima's anti-Soviet positions, the Imperial Japanese Government in April 1941 concluded a non-aggression pact with Moscow. The German armed forces invaded the Soviet Union in June and the German government was interested in a simultaneous Japanese attack on the USSR. However, prior to the invasion itself, the German government had not updated Ōshima about plans of attack. In a conversation held on 17 May 1941, Ernst von Weizsäcker, State Secretary in the German Foreign Office, denied that there was any tension with the Soviet government.

Following the invasion of the Soviet Union on 22 June 1941, pressure was placed on the Japanese government to join the invasion. On 9 July 1942, Ribbentrop tried to convince Ōshima to urge his government to join the attack on the Soviet Union. Ribbentrop's main argument being that "never again would Japan have such an opportunity as existed at present to eliminate once and for all the Russian colossus in eastern Asia". On 6 March 1943, Ōshima delivered Ribbentrop the following official statement from the Japanese government:

Supporting war crimes
Ōshima's high esteem with Hitler made him privy to some of the planning relating to actions later to be defined as war crimes and atrocities. One example was a meeting held between Ōshima and Hitler on 3 January 1942, where they both agreed on the action of sinking life-boats working for the rescue of Allied naval personnel fleeing ships sunk in military action. The official text reads:

At a meeting that Ōshima had on 27 May 1944 with Hitler and Ribbentrop, Hitler advised that the Japanese government should publicly hang every captured US pilot who was involved in air raids in hope of deterring further such attacks.

Intercepted dispatches

Virtually all of Ōshima's dispatches as ambassador were intercepted: approximately 75 during the last 11 months of 1941, some 100 in 1942, 400 in 1943, 600 in 1944, and about 300 during the just over four months of 1945 when Germany was at war. For example, in a dispatch decoded on 19 January 1942, Ribbentrop agreed to supply daily intelligence reports to Ōshima, which he could pass on to Tokyo. He warned that "any leakage of these reports due to our fault would be of grave consequence, so all the handling of these reports should be strictly secret". This despite the fact that the Germans often reproached him of the unreliability of the Japanese codes, although Ōshima assured them of its security. This laxity proved to be fatal to Japanese espionage efforts, as even much of the intelligence gathered by the Japanese spy network codenamed TO in Spain (with implicit support given by the Spanish authorities) was channelled through him. This evidence halted the loading of petroleum by the United States onto Spanish tankers in 1944.

While some of his predictions were wrong (Ōshima predicted that Britain would surrender to Germany before the end of 1941), his reporting of the Nazi leadership's plans and policies and his factual data were invaluable to the Allies. For example, on 6 June 1941, he advised Tokyo that Germany would invade the Soviet Union on 22 June (see Operation Barbarossa).

Another example was in November 1943, when Ōshima was taken on a four-day tour of the Atlantic Wall fortifications on the coast of France. Upon his return to Berlin, he wrote a detailed 20-page report of his visit, giving an account of the location of every German division and its manpower and weaponry. He described tank ditches in detail, armament of turrets located close to the shore, and available mobile forces. That provided valuable intelligence to the planners of the D-Day assault. Connected to that was that the Allies knew that Operation Fortitude was working because just one week before D-Day, Hitler confided to Ōshima that while the Allies might make diversionary feints in Norway, Brittany and Normandy, they will actually open up "an all-out second front in the area of the Straits of Dover". Thus, Ōshima dutifully reported that the bulk of German forces would not be waiting in Normandy but, mistakenly, at the Pas-de-Calais area.

His dispatches also proved to be valuable to those involved in the bombing campaign in Europe, as Ōshima provided details on the effect of Allied bombing raids on specific German targets, giving valuable and relatively unbiased bomb damage assessments to the Allies.

During and after the war

As the war progressed and Germany began to retreat, Ōshima never wavered in his confidence that Germany would emerge victorious. However, in March 1945, he reported to Tokyo on the "danger of Berlin becoming a battlefield" and revealing a fear "that the abandonment of Berlin may take place another month". On 13 April 1945, he met with Ribbentrop (for the last time, it turned out) and vowed to stand with the leaders of Nazi Germany in their hour of crisis. "I do not wish to be treated in the same manner as other diplomats merely by reason of great danger from the ravages of war", he proclaimed, but he was informed that evening by the Foreign Ministry's chief of protocol: all diplomats were to leave Berlin at once by Hitler's direct order. Ōshima subsequently accepted that order then sent his wife to Bad Gastein, a mountain resort in Austria, and, the next day, left to join her, together with most of the Japanese diplomatic staff.

Less than a month later, Germany surrendered and Ōshima and his staff were taken into custody. They were then deported from Austria to the United States by ship, arriving on 11 July 1945. After interrogation and internment in Bedford Springs Hotel, a resort hotel in the heart of the Allegheny Mountains, Pennsylvania, Ōshima was returned to Japan in November 1945.

Although he enjoyed freedom briefly in his devastated country, he was arrested on 16 December 1945 and charged with war crimes. He initially denied ever being close to Hitler and Ribbentrop. When brought before the International Military Tribunal for the Far East, he was found guilty of conspiring to wage aggressive war on 12 November 1948 and sentenced to life imprisonment. Ōshima was paroled in late 1955 and granted clemency three years later.

After his release, Ōshima lived in seclusion in Chigasaki, Kanagawa, refusing invitations from the ruling Liberal Democratic Party to enter into politics, in stark contrast to Nomura, the former Japanese ambassador to the United States, who was elected to several terms in the Diet after the war.

The former ambassador even refused requests for interviews and lectures, but his few remarks make clear that Oshima was a broken, remorseful old man. He called himself A failure who misled the nation and admitted that the Japanese alliance with Germany which he promoted was a catastrophic mistake, although his admiration for Hitler as a political leader never seems to have diminished. A neighbour recognised a photograph of the Japanese ambassador and Hitler shaking hands, possibly the photo seen above, in Oshima's living room. Ōshima died in 1975, never knowing that he had provided the Allies with invaluable intelligence during the war.

Decorations
 1938 -  Order of the Sacred Treasure, 2nd class
1940 -  Grand Cordon of the Order of the Rising Sun
1940 -  Grand Cross of the Order of Merit of the German Eagle in Gold with Star

See also
 German-Japanese relations
 List of Japanese ministers, envoys and ambassadors to Germany

References

Further reading

External links

 "Heinrich Georg Stahmer and Hiroshi Ōshima", Nippon News, No. 18. in the official website of NHK.
 . 
 Owen Cunningham papers at the University of Maryland libraries. Cunningham was a defense attorney during the trial of Hiroshi Oshima, and these papers contain legal documents related to the trial.

1886 births
1975 deaths
Military personnel from Gifu Prefecture
Imperial Japanese Army generals of World War II
Japanese military personnel of World War II
Japanese generals
Japanese fascists
Kazoku
Japanese people convicted of war crimes
Japanese people convicted of the international crime of aggression
Japanese prisoners sentenced to life imprisonment
Prisoners sentenced to life imprisonment by international courts and tribunals
People convicted by the International Military Tribunal for the Far East
Ambassadors of Japan to Germany
Japanese anti-communists
Japanese military attachés
Grand Cordons of the Order of the Rising Sun